Blackout is a 2022 American action crime thriller film directed by Sam Macaroni and starring Josh Duhamel, Abbie Cornish, Nick Nolte and Omar Chaparro.

Synopsis 
An undercover DEA agent wakes up with amnesia in a Mexican mental institution. While several drug cartels are looking for him, he gradually remembers his identity, though he's skeptical about some aspects.

Cast
Josh Duhamel as Cain
Abbie Cornish as Anna
Nick Nolte as DEA Agent Ethan McCoy
Omar Chaparro
Bárbara de Regil
Jose Sefami
Hernan Del Riego

Production
Principal photography began in Mexico City on November 5, 2020.

Release
The film was released on Netflix on October 12, 2022.

References

External links
 
 

American crime thriller films
American action thriller films
Films about Mexican drug cartels
Films set in hospitals
Films set in Tucson, Arizona
Films shot in Mexico City